Baron Tennyson, of Aldworth in the County of Sussex and of Freshwater in the Isle of Wight, is a title in the Peerage of the United Kingdom. It was created in 1884 for the poet Alfred Tennyson. His son, the second Baron, served as Governor-General of Australia, and his grandson, the third Baron, as a captain for the English cricket team. On the death in 2006 of the latter's younger son, the fifth Baron, the line of the eldest son of the first Baron failed. The title was inherited by the late Baron's second cousin once removed, the sixth and present holder of the peerage. He is the great-grandson of Hon. Lionel Tennyson, second son of the first Baron.

Another member of the Tennyson family was the naval architect Sir Eustace Tennyson-d'Eyncourt, 1st Baronet. He was the grandson of Charles Tennyson-d'Eyncourt, uncle of the first Baron Tennyson.

Barons Tennyson (1884)
Alfred Tennyson, 1st Baron Tennyson (1809–1892)
Hallam Tennyson, 2nd Baron Tennyson (1852–1928), elder son of the first baron
Lionel Hallam Tennyson, 3rd Baron Tennyson (1889–1951), son of the 2nd baron
Harold Christopher Tennyson, 4th Baron Tennyson (1919–1991), elder son of the 3rd baron
Mark Aubrey Tennyson, 5th Baron Tennyson (1920–2006), younger son of the 3rd baron
David Harold Alexander Tennyson, 6th Baron Tennyson (b. 1960), great-great-grandson of the 1st baron

The heir presumptive is the present holder's brother, Alan James Drummond Tennyson (b. 1965) and the heir presumptive's heir apparent is his son, Andrew Barnard Tennyson (b. 1992).

Line of succession

  Alfred Tennyson, 1st Baron Tennyson (1809–1892)
  Hallam Tennyson, 2nd Baron Tennyson (1852–1928)
  Major Lionel Hallam Tennyson, 3rd Baron Tennyson (1889–1951)
  Harold Christopher Tennyson, 4th Baron Tennyson (1919–1991)
  Mark Aubrey Tennyson, 5th Baron Tennyson (1920–2006)
 Hon. Lionel Tennyson (1854–1886)
 Alfred Browning Stanley Tennyson (1878–1952)
 James Alfred Tennyson (1913–2001)
  David Harold Alexander Tennyson, 6th Baron Tennyson (b. 1960)
 (1) Alan James Drummond Tennyson (b. 1965)
 (2) Andrew Barnard Tennyson (b. 1992)
 Sir Charles Bruce Locker Tennyson (1879–1977)
 (Charles) Julian Tennyson (1915–1945)
 (3) Simon Tennyson (b. 1939)
 (Beryl) Hallam Augustine Tennyson (1920–2005)
 (4) (Charles) Jonathan Penrose Tennyson (b. 1955)
 (5) Alexander Hallam Hopson Tennyson (b. 1986)
 (6) Matthew James Tennyson (b. 1988)
 (7) Frederick Penrose Tennyson (b. 1991)

See also
Emily, Lady Tennyson, wife of the 1st baron
Tennyson-d'Eyncourt baronets, of Carter's Corner Farm

Arms

Notes

References

 
1884 establishments in the United Kingdom
Baronies in the Peerage of the United Kingdom
Noble titles created in 1884
Tennant family